General elections were held in Barbados on 7 December 1956. The result was a victory for the Barbados Labour Party, which won 15 of the 24 seats. MPs were elected across twelve two-member constituencies, using the block vote method. Voter turnout was 60.3%.

Despite winning more votes than the newly formed Democratic Labour Party, the Progressive Conservative Party won fewer seats, a consequence of the plurality voting system used.

Results

References

Barbados
1956 in Barbados
Elections in Barbados
December 1956 events in North America